The 2012 Lory Meagher Cup was the fourth staging of the Lory Meagher Cup since its establishment in 2009. The draw for the 2012 fixtures took place on 14 November 2011. The competition began on 5 May 2012 and ended on 9 June 2012.

Donegal were the defending champions, however, they availed of their right to promotion to the Nicky Rackard Cup. Tyrone won the competition, defeating Fermanagh in the cup final.

Teams
A total of five teams contested the Lory Meagher Cup, including three sides from the 2011 Lory Meagher Cup and Tyrone and Longford.

Results

Round 1

Round 2

Round 3

Semi-finals

Final

Top scorers

Season

Single game

External links
 Lory Meagher Cup fixtures

References

Lory Meagher Cup
Lory Meagher Cup